The 2016–17 Saint Louis Billikens women's basketball team will represent the Saint Louis University during the 2016–17 NCAA Division I women's basketball season. The Billikens, led by fifth year head coach Lisa Stone, played their home games at the Chaifetz Arena and are members of the Atlantic 10 Conference.

2016–17 media
All non-televised Billikens home games and conference road games will stream on the A-10 Digital Network.

Roster

Schedule

|-
!colspan=9 style="background:#0000CC; color:#FFFFFF;"| Exhibition

|-
!colspan=9 style="background:#0000CC; color:#FFFFFF;"| Non-conference regular season

|-
!colspan=9 style="background:#0000CC; color:#FFFFFF;"| Atlantic 10 regular season

|-
!colspan=9 style="background:#0000CC;"| Atlantic 10 Tournament

|-
!colspan=9 style="background:#0000CC;"| Women's National Invitation Tournament

Rankings
2016–17 NCAA Division I women's basketball rankings

See also
 2016–17 Saint Louis Billikens men's basketball team

References

Saint Louis
Saint Louis Billikens women's basketball seasons
2017 Women's National Invitation Tournament participants